Camille Houssière (born 22 May 1992), better known as Camille Lou, is a French singer and musician. She is well known for her roles in musicals, including 1789: Les Amants de la Bastille in the role of Olympe, and La Légende du roi Arthur in the role of Reine Guenièvre.

Early life 
Camille Lou was born 22 May 1992 in Bersillies, near Maubeuge. Her father was a singer and guitarist for the group Paradoxe, thus she and her two older sisters were exposed to music at a young age, each later learning to play an instrument, Camille played the violin. At the age of twelve, she won a local singing competition, les Voix de Noël, in Hautmont. She attended lycée Notre-Dame de Grâce à Maubeuge. After having obtained her baccalaureate she attended the University of Valenciennes.

Solo career 
In January 2010, with the help of her guitar teacher at the time, Camille began her solo career under the pseudonym Jimmie. She began to sing and completed her first album La Grande Aventure, in pop-folk style. She made many appearances under her pseudonym, notably for her work on Coeur de Pirate's album in March 2010.

On 15 September 2017, she released the single "Self Control".

Musicals 
Being friends with fellow singers Nuno Resende and Merwan Rim, she was encouraged by the latter to sing in front of Dove Attia, a musical producer with whom Resende and Rim had both worked with on Mozart, l'opéra rock. While attending a Parisian restaurant one evening, Camille and her family by chance were there at the same time as musical producer Dove Attia and singers from Mozart, l'opéra rock. Camille was encouraged by Rim to sing Falling Slowly from the film Once in front of Attia. Despite Camille having little prior experience in musical theatre, Attia was impressed and invited Camille to audition for his next musical. She sang a collection of songs from Mozart, l'opéra rock among others and finally in 2011, she won the role Olympe, servant of Marie Antoinette in the musical 1789: Les Amants de la Bastille. Camille starred in the role for two runs of the show at the Palais des Sports in Paris as well as the 2012 tour around the country.

In 2014, Dove Attia proposed the role of Guenièvre (Guinivere) to Camille in his new musical, La Légende du roi Arthur, also featuring Florent Mothe's Arthur and Zaho's Morgane (Morgana). The musical was first performed on 17 September 2015 at Palais des congrès de Paris and toured France in 2016. Camille appears in her role in music videos for "Mon combat (Tir Nam Beo)", "Quelque chose de magique", and "Auprès d'un autre" (the latter also features peaks at the activity behind the scenes).

Other projects 
In December 2014, she recorded a song for the album We Love Disney with Garou, a cover of the song "Beauty and the Beast" from the Disney film of the same name.

She participated in the album Forever Gentlemen Volume 2 singing a cover of "La soleil de ma vie" with Amir.

She also was featured in a photoshoot for Tara Jarmon.

Following 1789: Les Amants de la Bastille, she became dedicated to her solo projects but also equally to her band composed of five singers that performed in Les Chansons d'abord at the side of Natasha St-Pier, broadcast each Sunday at 5 pm on France 3.

Camille was cast as Hélène Barignet in Emmanuel Fricero's film Marché noir.

In 2016, she took part in season 7 of the French version of Dancing with the Stars partnered with Grégoire Lyonnet, finishing in second place.

Filmography

Television
 2018 : Les Bracelets rouges (fr) - Aurore
 2018 : Maman a tort (fr) - Angie
 2019 : Le Bazar de la Charité - Alice de Jeansin
 2021-2023 : Je te promets (fr), French remake of US TV serie This Is Us - Florence Gallo
 2021 : J'ai menti - Audrey Barreyre
 2021 : Christmas Flow - Mel
 2022 : Women at War - Suzanne Faure

Film
 2012 : 1789: Les Amants de la Bastille (Filming of the stage musical) - Olympe du Puget
 2015 : La Légende du roi Arthur (Filming of the stage musical) - Guenièvre
 2019 : Jusqu'ici tout va bien (fr) - Élodie
 2020 : Play - Fanny
 2021 : Spoiled Brats - Stella Bartek

References

External links

1992 births
Living people
Pop rock singers
People from Nord (French department)
Lou, Camille
French folk-pop singers
21st-century French singers
21st-century French women singers